The U.S. Army Corps of Engineers Duluth Vessel Yard is a federal port facility in Duluth, Minnesota, United States.  It houses the United States Army Corps of Engineers (USACE) resources used to maintain the harbors of the Twin Ports of Duluth and Superior, Wisconsin.  It was established on Minnesota Point in 1903, though most of its present configuration dates to a flurry of construction in 1941.

The Duluth Vessel Yard was listed on the National Register of Historic Places in 1995 for its local significance in the themes of community planning and development, conservation, engineering, maritime history, politics/government, and transportation.  It was nominated for its significant role in developing and maintaining the harbor that underpins the Twin Ports economy and for encapsulating federal involvement in local transportation infrastructure.

History
After the construction of the St. Mary's Falls Ship Canal was completed at Sault Ste. Marie, ships carrying grain, lumber, coal, and iron ore could carry the natural resources of the Midwestern United States to East Coast ports. By the late 19th century the U.S. Army Corps of Engineers was tasked to create a bustling harbor at the western end of Lake Superior. For several years they created breakwaters, dredged channels, and built docks to accommodate ever-larger cargo-hauling ships. By the turn of the 20th century, the Vermilion and Mesabi Iron Ranges were producing nearly 8 million long tons (8,100,000 Mg) of ore per year. By 1906, the quantity of material shipped through the harbors was superseded only by that of New York and Philadelphia.

See also
 National Register of Historic Places listings in St. Louis County, Minnesota

References

1903 establishments in Minnesota
Buildings and structures in Duluth, Minnesota
Duluth–Superior metropolitan area
Government buildings completed in 1941
Historic districts on the National Register of Historic Places in Minnesota
Military facilities on the National Register of Historic Places in Minnesota
National Register of Historic Places in St. Louis County, Minnesota
Transportation buildings and structures on the National Register of Historic Places in Minnesota
United States Army Corps of Engineers